The Canadian Maple Leaf coins are bullion coins of gold, silver, platinum, or palladium, issued by the Royal Canadian Mint:

 Canadian Gold Maple Leaf
 Canadian Silver Maple Leaf
 Canadian Platinum Maple Leaf
 Canadian Palladium Maple Leaf

References